Adrian Erlandsson (born 27 October 1970) is a Swedish heavy metal drummer who is a member of At the Gates (1990–1996, 2007–2008, 2010–present),  the Haunted (1996–1999, 2013–present), and Nemhain (2006–present).

He has also been a member of H.E.A.L. (1994–1996), Hyperhug (1994–1996), Decameron (1997), Cradle of Filth (1999–2006), Needleye (2006–?), Brujeria (2006–2013), Netherbird (2007–2010), and Paradise Lost (2009–2016).

Erlandsson currently resides in London where he owns a photo studio.

Biography 
Erlandsson was born in Malmö to a Swedish father with Romanian roots. He's the older brother of Daniel Erlandsson, the drummer of Arch Enemy, and ex-Carcass. They both grew up together in Sweden and started playing drums at a very young age but with Adrian's career beginning in 1981 at the age of 11 after getting his first drum kit, and started to play with friends began playing covers of classic rock songs. He got his brother into drumming as Daniel admits "If it wasn't for him I probably wouldn't be playing today." They also started playing with their music teacher at school, and eventually began to write their own songs and formed a band.

Inspired by Judas Priest, he formed the Black Nuns which evolved into Berits Polisonger playing until 1986. There then followed a series of other bands including thrash metal band Penance in 1987. Erlandsson went on to form Penance, a thrash metal band, which never recorded a demo, although they did record some rehearsal tracks.

As soon as he could hold down his first beat, Adrian Erlandsson and a friend formed a band and covered classic rock songs. The first song they learned was Joan Jett's "I Love Rock 'n' Roll" They soon gathered more members and began playing covers by bands like Def Leppard, Dokken, The Exploited, GBH, Thin Lizzy and Twisted Sister.

Bands

At the Gates 
Erlandsson then went to University in Gothenburg, where in 1990, he joined the Swedish death metal band At the Gates. He was the band's drummer until they broke up, and received critical and fan praise for his speed and precision. When asked what each at the Gates member contributes to the group's overall sound, bandmember Anders Björler said that Erlandsson "hit the drums hard".

In 2007, At the Gates reunited for some festival shows in the summer of 2008 and a headlining US tour which was dubbed Suicidal Final Tour and at the time, mentioned that they would disband after the 2008 tour. In December 2010, the band reunited again, and released their fifth studio album At War with Reality in October 2014.

Terror 
He was a founding member of the supergroup Terror in the Spring of 1994 with Jon Nödtveidt and his At the Gates bandmates, Anders Björler & Jonas Björler. The band existed for a few weeks but released Demo '94 in April 1994.

The Haunted 
The day after the first demise of At the Gates, being 27 July 1996, Erlandsson formed The Haunted with Patrik Jensen. Erlandsson remained in the band before departing in June 1999 due to eventually not liking the deal the band had Earache Records.

Later on in 2012, when Per Möller Jensen (the drummer who replaced Erlandsson back in '99) quit The Haunted, the remainder of the band who had also lost 2 other members other than Möller, had difficulty for a year to search for a new drummer, until Patrik Jensen phoned Erlandsson in April 2013 to rejoin. When Erlandsson asked Jensen as to who else was in the band, he responded with new members Marco Aro and Ola Englund. Having knowing those members and respecting them at their musical abilities, Erlandsson immediately jumped at the chance to join and put his musical input with them. On 26 June 2013, The Haunted released a YouTube video titled "The Haunted returns with a revamped line-up!" which officially announced the returns of both Erlandsson and vocalist Marco Aro.

Cradle of Filth 
Erlandsson mentioned how he was hired by Cradle of Filth stating:

In 2006, according to an official Roadrunner press release, Erlandsson left with the intention of devoting his energies to his two side projects, Nemhain and the since-defunct Needleye. "I have enjoyed my time with Cradle but it is now time to move on. I feel I am going out on a high as Thornography is definitely our best album to date".

Nemhain 
Erlandsson formed Nemhain with his wife Amber Erlandsson, known as a fetish model under the name Morrigan Hel, in March 2006. The band returns Erlandsson to his roots as a rock drummer.
Nemhain recorded its debut album From the Ashes in Studio Fredman during the late spring 2008 due for a release in April 2009.

Paradise Lost 

In March 2009, Erlandsson joined the British gothic metal band Paradise Lost under Jeff Walker's recommendation. Although he was hired after the recording Faith Divides Us Death Unites Us, he was in the music video The Rise of Denial.

Throughout random times from 2009 to 2014, Erlandsson was unable to play with the band due to commitments with his other bands most notably At the Gates. In June 2016, he announced on his Facebook page that he will no longer play drums for Paradise Lost due to other band commitments.

Vallenfyre 
In 2010 he was hired again to be in another band of Gregory Mackintosh from Paradise Lost called Vallenfyre. In 2014, just like in Paradise Lost, Erlandsson has been unable to play with the band due to commitments with his other bands.

Other projects 
Erlandsson has also played in Nifelheim. While Adrian was in Cradle of Filth, due to band's poor reputation in the black metal scene, he was fired from Nifelheim, who said it was "like a very bad, bad dream" to have had "a drummer who plays in CRADLE OF WIMPS now", and that he was "a schooled drummer" but "had problems to understand the most twisted and sickest riffs".

In late 2007, Erlandsson recorded the drums for a three track EP for London band Green River Project.

The year 2008 saw Erlandsson fill in for Deathstars on their tour in Europe supporting Korn.

In 2012 Erlandsson took part in a still unreleased and secretive project with the band HIYF. (needs more details)

Equipment

Sabian Cymbals 
19 Paragon China
15 HHX Xcelerator hats
20 AAX Iso crash
10 AAX Ozone splash
10 AA Mini holy china
19 Artisan crash
20 AAX Vcrash
22 HH Power bell ride
19 Holy China

Left to right. Date: April 2021

Drumsticks 
 Vic Firth Rock Nylon Tip. (At The Gates signature version).

Hardware 
Monolit Czarcie Kopyto

TAMA Starclassic Bubinga 
BD: 22x18
T1: 10x8
T2: 12x9
T3: 14x11 (mostly only at recording sessions).
FT1: 16X16
FT2: 18x16
SD: 14x6.5 Tama Bell Brass Snare (usually with Die Cast hoops instead of Brass Hoops)

Date: April 2021

Evans Accessories 
AF Patch – Kevlar Single Pedal
EMAD Onyx Batter Drumhead
EC Reverse Dot Snare Drumhead
Glass 500 Snare Side Drumhead
Puresound Blasters Series Snare Wires
EC2 Clear Drumhead
Resonant Black Drumhead
Magnetic Head Key
Compact Flip Key
Torque Drum Key

Discography

References

External links 

Adrian's last interview as the drummer for Cradle of Filth

1970 births
Living people
Swedish heavy metal drummers
Swedish people of Romanian descent
The Haunted (Swedish band) members
Cradle of Filth members
People from Malmö
Musicians from London
Swedish emigrants to the United Kingdom
Brujeria (band) members
At the Gates members
Paradise Lost (band) members
21st-century drummers